Light And Darkness is the third album of the Italian singer and songwriter Perseo Miranda. It contains 12 tracks and was released on June 4, 2006 under the label Lodger Records.

Track listing
"Light and Darkness"
"It's a Reality"
"Have Fire with the Fire"
"The Choice of Sin"
"The Power of the Silence" 		
"Where Is the Answer"
"The Doors Are closed"
"My Reason"
"The Feast of the Sun"
"Crucified"
"Relative Conceptions"
"Positive or Negative"

References

External links
 Perseo Miranda official website
 Perseo Miranda official Myspace site
 Light and Darkness review by Metallized.it webzine

2006 albums
Perseo Miranda albums